The following is a limited list of mutual-fund families in the United States. A family of mutual funds is a group of funds that are marketed under one or more brand names, usually having the same distributor (the company which handles selling and redeeming shares of the fund in transactions with investors), and investment advisor (which is usually a corporate cousin of the distributor).

There are several hundred families of registered mutual funds in the United States, some with a single fund and others offering dozens. Many fund families are units of a larger financial services company such as an asset manager, bank, stock brokerage, or insurance company. Additionally, multiple funds in a family can be part of the same corporate structure; that is, one underlying corporation or business trust may divide itself into more than one fund, each of which issues shares separately.



Fund families

Aberdeen Asset Management
AIM (Invesco)
AllianceBernstein
Allianz
AlphaCentric Funds
Amana Mutual Funds Trust
American Beacon
American Century
American Funds (The Capital Group Companies)
Ariel Investments
Ave Maria Mutual Funds
Barclays Global Investors
Baron Funds
BlackRock
BNY Mellon (The Bank of New York Mellon)
Calamos
Calvert Investments
Columbia (Ameriprise Financial)
Credit Suisse
Dimensional Fund Advisors
Delaware Investments
Dodge & Cox
Dreyfus
Eaton Vance
Federated
Fidelity
First Eagle Funds
Franklin Templeton
Gabelli & GAMCO Funds
Goldman Sachs
Invesco (AMVESCAP)
Janus Henderson Investors
John Hancock
JPMorgan
Legg Mason
MainStay Investments
Mellon Funds
MetLife
MFS
Morgan Stanley
Natixis Global Asset Management
Northern
Old Mutual
PIMCO (Pacific Investment Management)
Pax World
Putnam
Schwab
State Farm
State Street
Thrivent Financial for Lutherans
TIAA-CREF
T. Rowe Price
Truist Financial
Tweedy, Browne
USAA
Value Line
Vanguard
Van Kampen
Virtus Investment Partners
Waddell and Reed
Wells Fargo Funds
Wilshire Associates

See also
List of asset management firms

Mutual-fund families
Mutual Fund